Lucius Caecilius Metellus Denter was consul in 284 BC, and praetor the year after.  In this capacity, he fell in the war against the Senones and was succeeded by Manius Curius Dentatus.

Fischer, in his Römische Zeittafeln, has him as praetor and also dying in 285 BC, and in the year following he has him again as consul. Wilhelm Drumann denies the identity of the consul and the praetor, on the ground that it was not customary for a person to hold the praetorship the year after his consulship; but examples of such a mode of proceeding do occur, so Drumann's objection fails.

Denter may have been the father of Lucius Caecilius Metellus, consul in 251 and 247 BC. The latter's filiation is given as "L. f. C. n.", the son of Lucius and grandson of Gaius. In this case, Denter's father would have been Gaius Caecilius Metellus. An alternative hypothesis makes him the son or nephew of a Quintus Caecilius, supposedly tribune of the plebs in 316 BC. No corresponding individual appears in The Magistrates of the Roman Republic, or in the Dictionary of Greek and Roman Biography and Mythology.

See also
Caecilia gens

Footnotes

External links
JSTOR: Classical Quarterly: New Series, Vol. 22, No. 2 (Nov., 1972), pp. 309-325
Dictionary of Greek and Roman Biography and Mythology, page 993 (v. 1)

280s BC deaths
3rd-century BC Roman consuls
Ancient Roman generals
Denter, Lucius
Roman generals killed in action
Roman Republican praetors
Year of birth unknown